The John and Sarah Sheffield House, also known as Paradise Springs Farm, in southeast Portland in the U.S. state of Oregon, is a two-story dwelling listed on the National Register of Historic Places. Built in 1866 as a farm house, it was added to the register in 1991. It is one of the oldest remaining homes in its neighborhood.

Located on the western slope of Mount Tabor, the house is in a residential part of the Sunnyside neighborhood. Built in a Classic Revival architectural style with Italianate decorative elements, the two-story structure was augmented in the early 20th century by two single-story additions to the rear. The original house plan is based on two gables set perpendicular to one another. Constructed of heavy timbers, the house is balloon-framed and is supported by brick columns and by timbers that rest on bricks and stones. Most of the original sash windows contain wavy glass with air bubbles. These rooms have original baseboard with crown molding and four-panel doors. A staircase with a banister and a turned newel post connects the two levels.

History
In 1866, the Sheffields bought  of this property from the Prettymans and built the T-shaped house, which they sold in 1872. At the time the Sheffields bought the property, East Portland was sparsely settled except for businesses along the east bank of the Willamette River. Most residents further east were farmers who lived in small cabins or were engaged in building the first homes. Though many changes occurred in the neighborhood after the house was built, the Sheffield house has retained most of its original features.

See also
 National Register of Historic Places listings in Southeast Portland, Oregon

References

Houses on the National Register of Historic Places in Portland, Oregon
Italianate architecture in Oregon
Neoclassical architecture in Oregon
Houses completed in 1866
1866 establishments in Oregon
Sunnyside, Portland, Oregon
Portland Historic Landmarks